The Kermesidae are a family of scale insects belonging to the superfamily Coccoidea.  The type genus, Kermes, includes the kermes scale insects, from which a red dye, also called kermes (a.k.a. crimson), is obtained.

External links
 Allokermes kingii,  northern red-oak kermes, kermes scale on the UF / IFAS Featured Creatures Web site

 
Scale insects
Hemiptera families
Neococcoids